The City of the Dead (2001) is a BBC Books original novel written by Lloyd Rose and based on the long-running British science fiction television series Doctor Who. It features the Eighth Doctor, Fitz and Anji.

External links
The Cloister Library - The City of the Dead

2001 British novels
2001 science fiction novels
Eighth Doctor Adventures
Novels by Lloyd Rose